is a Japanese sport shooter. She has produced a career tally of six medals, including two golds in women's double trap shooting at the Asian Championships in Kuala Lumpur, Malaysia, and also finished fifth at the 2004 Summer Olympics in Athens. Inoue serves and trains full-time as a member of the Japanese Clay Target Shooting Association, under head coach Hiroshi Teranishi.

Inoue came to prominence in the world shooting scene at the 2004 Asian Championships in Kuala Lumpur, Malaysia, where she claimed the gold medal in the women's double trap final with a score of 138. Inoue's astonishing success and a minimum qualifying score of 106 led to her selection on the Japanese shooting team for her only Olympic debut.

Six months after her illustrious victory from the Asian Championships, Inoue qualified for her first and only Japanese squad in the women's double trap at the 2004 Summer Olympics in Athens. She put up a stringent top-level effort with an unparalleled qualifying score of 106 to seal a third seed in the six-woman final, but fell out of the medal podium by a two-point margin that ended her up in fifth. Inoue's total score of 140 proved to be more rewarding than her previous career feat from the Asian Championships by just two targets.

With the women's double trap being officially removed from the Olympic program, Inoue decided to focus solely on trap shooting. In 2005, she held off a charge from the rest of the field to set a new world-record score of 88 hits for the gold medal victory at the ISSF World Cup meet in Changwon, South Korea.

References

External links

Japanese Olympic Committee Bio 

1973 births
Living people
Japanese female sport shooters
Olympic shooters of Japan
Shooters at the 2004 Summer Olympics
Shooters at the 1998 Asian Games
Shooters at the 2002 Asian Games
Shooters at the 2010 Asian Games
Shooters at the 2014 Asian Games
World record holders in shooting
People from Sagamihara
Sportspeople from Kanagawa Prefecture
Asian Games medalists in shooting
Asian Games bronze medalists for Japan
Medalists at the 1998 Asian Games
Medalists at the 2002 Asian Games
20th-century Japanese women
21st-century Japanese women